Deir ez-Zor Municipal Stadium is a multi-purpose stadium in Deir ez-Zor, Syria. It is currently used mostly for football matches. The stadium has a capacity of 13,000 spectators.

An artificial training field was opened near the stadium in 2007.

However, the stadium was heavily damaged between 2015 and 2017, while being occupied by the militants of the Islamic State of Iraq and the Levant.

See also 
List of football stadiums in Syria

References

Football venues in Syria
Multi-purpose stadiums in Syria
Buildings and structures in Deir ez-Zor